Ligia australiensis, the Australian marine slater, is a woodlouse in the family Ligiidae.

Range
It can be found quite readily along the southern coast of Australia, including Tasmania, hiding under a huge variety of cover. It is not found as often on the coast of New South Wales, although it can be found in abundance in estuaries.

Predation
L. australienses is a frequent meal for the burrowing shore crab (Leptograpsodes octodentatus), occasionally for the sacred kingfisher (Todiramphus sanctus), and possibly the Pedra Branca skink (Niveoscincus palfreymani).

References

External links

Woodlice
Crustaceans described in 1853
Crustaceans of Australia